The Jinnah–Mountbatten Talks were bilateral talks held in Lahore between the Governor-Generals Muhammad Ali Jinnah and Louis Mountbatten of Pakistan and India, to address the Kashmir dispute. The talks were held on 1 November 1947, five days after India dispatched its troops to defend the princely state of Kashmir(which was a Muslim majority state recently acceded to India) against a tribal invasion. In the talks, Mountbatten presented India's offer to hold an impartial plebiscite under the United Nations auspices to decide the accession of Kashmir. Jinnah effectively rejected the offer.

Background 
Officially, the talks were to be held between the Governor-Generals and Prime Ministers of India and Pakistan at the state level, focused on the Kashmir dispute on November 1947. The British government originally facilitated the negotiations in New Delhi, but the venue of the meeting was changed to Lahore. Before the negotiations started, Prime Minister Nehru fell ill and his Deputy PM, Vallabhbhai Patel, refused to come to Lahore, stating "there was nothing to discuss with Pakistan's leadership."

Talks 
On 1 November 1947, Louis Mountbatten left for Pakistan to begin talks between the Governor-Generals of India and Pakistan over the issue of Kashmir. The talks lasted for three-and-a-half hours, where Mountbatten offered to Jinnah that India would hold a plebiscite in the state of Jammu and Kashmir, provided that Pakistan withdrew its military support for the Azad Kashmir forces and their allies. Mountbatten also stipulated that the Indian Army would remain in the Kashmir Valley. Jinnah opposed the plan and claimed that the Kashmir, with its massive Muslim majority, belonged to Pakistan as an essential element in an incomplete partition process.

Analysis 
From the perspective of many authors, Jinnah was also convinced that a plebiscite under the supervision of the Indian Army would be sabotaged. Instead, he proposed an immediate and simultaneous withdrawal on both sides, including the Pakistani military and their allies, Pathan tribesmen, and the Indian troops. Hearing the proposal, Mountbatten told Jinnah that he needed the consent of Nehru and Patel. The talks failed to reach agreement and the Kashmir issue was referred to the United Nations.

References

Bibliography

External links
 
 
 

Diplomatic conferences in Pakistan
India–Pakistan relations
Government of Liaquat Ali Khan
1947 in politics
1947 in India
1947 in Pakistan
1947 in international relations
History of the foreign relations of Pakistan
Diplomacy regarding the Kashmir conflict
1947 conferences